Martinengo may refer to:

People
Federico Martinengo (1889–1943), Italian flying ace and admiral
Giulio Cesare Martinengo (c. 1564 – 1613), Italian composer
Maria Maddalena Martinengo, (1687–1737), Italian Roman Catholic saint
Serge Martinengo de Novack, French football manager

Other uses
Martinengo (Italy), a comune in the Province of Bergamo
Pinacoteca Tosio Martinengo, an art museum in Brescia, Lombardy
Martinengo Altarpiece, a 1516 painting by Lorenzo Lotto